Iolaus crawshayi, the Crawshay's sapphire, is a butterfly in the family Lycaenidae. It is found in Ethiopia, Somalia, Kenya, Uganda, the Democratic Republic of the Congo and Tanzania. The habitat consists of moist savanna.

The larvae feed on the young leaves of Erianthemum dregei and Phragmanthera usuiensis. They are dull dirty whitish green or brown.

Subspecies
I. c. crawshayi (Kenya: highlands east of the Rift Valley)
I. c. elgonae (Stempffer & Bennett, 1958) (Kenya, Uganda)
I. c. littoralis (Stempffer & Bennett, 1958) (Tanzania: east and inland to Moshi and Korogwe and south to Lindi, Democratic Republic of the Congo: Shaba, Kenya: eastern lowlands and inland to Makindu, the Kitui district and Mount Marsabit)
I. c. maureli Dufrane, 1954 (Ethiopia, southern Somalia, north-eastern Kenya)
I. c. niloticus (Stempffer & Bennett, 1958) (Uganda: West Nile district)
I. c. nyanzae (Stempffer & Bennett, 1958) (Kenya: western highlands, Uganda: Jinja)

References

External links

Die Gross-Schmetterlinge der Erde 13: Die Afrikanischen Tagfalter. Plate XIII 68 c

Butterflies described in 1901
Iolaus (butterfly)